Frederick Wiseman (born January 1, 1930) is an American filmmaker, documentarian, and theater director. His work is "devoted primarily to exploring American institutions". He has been called "one of the most important and original filmmakers working today".

Life and career
Wiseman was born to a Jewish family in Boston, Massachusetts, the son of Gertrude Leah (née Kotzen) and Jacob Leo Wiseman. He earned a Bachelor of Arts from Williams College in 1951, and a Bachelor of Laws from Yale Law School in 1954. He spent 1954 to 1956 serving in the U.S. Army during the Korean War. The Korean War was effectively over by July 1953.  Wiseman spent a few years in Paris, France, before returning to the United States, where he took a job teaching law at the Boston University Institute of Law and Medicine. He then started documentary filmmaking, and has won numerous film awards as well as Guggenheim and MacArthur fellowships.

The first feature-length film Wiseman produced was The Cool World (1963). This was followed by Titicut Follies in 1967, which he produced and directed. He has both produced and directed all of his films since. They are chiefly studies of social institutions, such as hospitals, high schools, or police departments. All his films have aired on PBS, one of his primary funders.

Wiseman's films are often described as in the observational mode, which has its roots in direct cinema, but Wiseman dislikes the term:
What I try to do is edit the films so that they will have a dramatic structure. That is why I object to some extent to the term "observational cinema" or cinéma vérité, because observational cinema, to me at least, connotes just hanging around with one thing being as valuable as another, and that is not true. At least, that is not true for me, and cinéma verité is just a pompous French term that has absolutely no meaning as far as I'm concerned. 

Wiseman has been known to call his films "Reality Fictions".

Awards
In 2003, Wiseman received the Dan David Prize for his films. In 2006, he received the George Polk Career Award, given annually by Long Island University to honor contributions to journalistic integrity and investigative reporting. In spring 2012, Wiseman actively took part in the three-month exposition of the Whitney Biennial. In 2014, he was awarded the Golden Lion for Lifetime Achievement at the 71st Venice International Film Festival. In 2016, Wiseman received an Academy Honorary Award from the Academy of Motion Picture Arts and Sciences.

Philosophy

Wiseman's films are, in his view, elaborations of a personal experience and not ideologically objective portraits of his subjects.

In interviews, Wiseman has emphasized that his films are not and cannot be unbiased. In spite of the inescapable bias that is introduced in the process of "making a movie", he still feels he has certain ethical obligations as to how he portrays events:
[My films are] based on unstaged, un-manipulated actions... The editing is highly manipulative and the shooting is highly manipulative... What you choose to shoot, the way you shoot it, the way you edit it and the way you structure it... all of those things... represent subjective choices that you have to make. In [Belfast, Maine] I had 110 hours of material ... I only used 4 hours – near nothing. The compression within a sequence represents choice and then the way the sequences are arranged in relationship to the other represents choice.

All aspects of documentary filmmaking involve choice and are therefore manipulative. But the ethical ... aspect of it is that you have to ... try to make [a film that] is true to the spirit of your sense of what was going on. ... My view is that these films are biased, prejudiced, condensed, compressed but fair. I think what I do is make movies that are not accurate in any objective sense, but accurate in the sense that I think they're a fair account of the experience I've had in making the movie.

I think I have an obligation to the people who have consented to be in the film, ... to cut it so that it fairly represents what I felt was going on at the time in the original event.

Process and style
Wiseman works four to six weeks in the institutions he portrays, with almost no preparation. He spends the bulk of the production period editing the material, trying to find a rhythm to make a movie.

Every Wiseman film has a dramatic structure, though not necessarily a narrative arc; his films rarely have what could be considered a distinct climax and conclusion. He likes to base his sequence structure with no particular thesis or point of view in mind. Any suspense is on a per-scene level, not constructed from plot points, and there are no characters with whom the viewer is expected to identify. Nevertheless, Wiseman feels that drama is a crucial element for his films to "work as movies" (Poppy). The "rhythm and structure" (Wiseman) of Wiseman's films pull the viewer into the position and perspective of the subject (human or otherwise). The viewer feels the dramatic tension of the situations portrayed, as various environmental forces create complicated situations and conflicting values for the subject.

Wiseman openly admits to manipulating his source material to create dramatic structure, and indeed insists that it is necessary to "make a movie":
I'm trying to make a movie. A movie has to have dramatic sequence and structure. I don't have a very precise definition about what constitutes drama, but I'm gambling that I'm going to get dramatic episodes. Otherwise, it becomes Empire. ... I am looking for drama, though I'm not necessarily looking for people beating each other up, shooting each other. There's a lot of drama in ordinary experiences. In Public Housing, there was drama in that old man being evicted from his apartment by the police. There was a lot of drama in that old woman at her kitchen table peeling a cabbage.

Wiseman has said that the structure of his films is important to the overall message:
Well, it's the structural aspect that interests me most, and the issue there is developing a theory that will relate these isolated, nonrelated sequences to each other. That is partially, I think, related to figuring out how it either contradicts or adds to or explains in some way some other sequence in the film. Then you try to determine the effect of a particular sequence on that point of view of the film.

A distinctive aspect of Wiseman's style is the complete lack of exposition (narration), interaction (interviews), and reflection (revealing any of the filmmaking process). Wiseman has said that he does not "feel any need to document [his] experience" and that he feels that such reflexive elements in films are vain.

While producing a film, Wiseman often acquires more than 100 hours of raw footage. His ability to create an engaging and interesting feature-length film without the use of voice-over, title cards, or motion graphics, while still being "fair", has been described as the reason Wiseman is seen as a true master of documentary film.

This great glop of material which represents the externally recorded memory of my experience of making the film is of necessity incomplete. The memories not preserved on film float somewhat in my mind as fragments available for recall, unavailable for inclusion but of great importance in the mining and shifting process known as editing. This editorial process ... is sometimes deductive, sometimes associational, sometimes non-logical and sometimes a failure... The crucial element for me is to try and think through my own relationship to the material by whatever combination of means is compatible. This involves a need to conduct a four-way conversation between myself, the sequence being worked on, my memory, and general values and experience.

Filmography

The Cool World (1963) (producer only)
Titicut Follies (1967)
High School (1968)
Law and Order (1969)
Hospital (1970)
I Miss Sonia Henie (1971)
Basic Training (1971)
Essene (1972)
Juvenile Court (1973)
Primate (1974)
Welfare (1975)
Meat (1976)
Canal Zone (1977)
Sinai Field Mission (1978)
Manoeuvre (1979)
Seraphita's Diary (1980)
Model (1980)
The Store (1983)
Racetrack (1985)
Blind (1986)
Deaf (1986)
Adjustment and Work (1986)
Multi-Handicapped (1986)
Missile (1988)
Near Death (1989)
Central Park (1989)
Aspen (1991)
Zoo (1993)
High School II (1994)
Ballet (1995)
La Comédie-Française ou l'Amour joué (1996)
Public Housing (1997)
Belfast, Maine (1999)
Domestic Violence (2001)
La dernière lettre / The Last Letter (2002) – filmed version of his directed stage play at Comédie-Française
Domestic Violence 2 (2002)
The Garden (2005) (unreleased)
State Legislature (2007)
La Danse (2009) – about the Ballet de l'Opéra National de Paris
Boxing Gym (2010)
Crazy Horse (2011) – about the Crazy Horse nightclub in Paris
At Berkeley (2013)
National Gallery (2014)
In Jackson Heights (2015)
Ex Libris – The New York Public Library (2017)
Monrovia, Indiana (2018)
City Hall (2020)
A Couple (2022)
Other People's Children (2022) – actor

Theatrical work
In addition to his better known film work, Wiseman has also directed and been involved in theater, in the US and France.
Emily Dickinson, La Belle d’Amherst (The Belle of Amherst) by William Luce. Le Théâtre Noir, Paris, Director, May–July, 2012
Oh les beaux jours by Samuel Beckett. La Comédie Française, Paris. Director, November – January 2006; Director & Actor, Jan–March 2007.
The Last Letter an adaptation from the novel Life and Fate by Vasily Grossman
Theatre for a New Audience, New York. Director, December 2003
North American Tour with La Comédie Française production (Ottawa/Toronto, Canada; Cambridge/Springfield, MA; New York, NY; Chicago, IL) Director, May–June 2001
La Comédie Française, Paris. Director, March–April 2000, September–November, 2000
Welfare: The Opera, story by Frederick Wiseman and David Slavitt, libretto by David Slavitt, music by Lenny Pickett.
St. Anne's Center for Restoration and the Arts, New York. Director, May 1997
American Music Theater Festival, Philadelphia. Director, June 1992
American Repertory Theatre, Cambridge. Director, May 1988
Hate by Joshua Goldstein. American Repertory Theatre, Cambridge. Director, January 1991
Tonight We Improvise by Luigi Pirandello. American Repertory Theatre, Cambridge. Director of video sequences and actor in role of documentary filmmaker, November 1986 – February 1987

References

Sources
Aftab, Kaleem Aftab; Alexandra Weltz "Frederick Wiseman" (Interview) on iol.ie

Further reading
Benson, Thomas W.; Carolyn Anderson, Reality Fictions: The Films of Frederick Wiseman, 2nd edition (Carbondale: Southern Illinois University Press, 2002). (Comprehensive history and criticism of the films.)
Bergman, Barry, "43 years after Titicut Follies, it's Berkeley, the movie", UC Berkeley News, September 14, 2010.
Grant, Barry Keith, Voyages of Discovery: The Cinema of Frederick Wiseman, University of Illinois Press, 1992. (Wiseman's oeuvre: 1963–1990)
Mamber, Stephen, Cinema Verité in America: Studies in Uncontrolled Documentary, Cambridge and London, MIT Press, 1974. 
Saunders, Dave, Direct Cinema: Observational Documentary and the Politics of the Sixties, London: Wallflower Press, 2007. (Contains a lengthy section on Wiseman's first five films)
Siegel Joshua; de Navacelle Marie-Christine, "Frederick Wiseman", The Museum of Modern Art, New York, 2010. 
Vachani, Nilita, "Revisiting Fred Wiseman's Law and Order in the Era of Black Lives Matter", Film International, October 14, 2020.

External links

Zipporah Films Official distributor of Wiseman's work
Frederick Wiseman on Reality and film – Statement at La clé des langues
A Discussion with Frederick Wiseman and Robert Kramer – Documentary Box
Interview with Frederick Wiseman for Slant Magazine by Budd Wilkins
Interview with Wiseman at Not Coming to a Theater Near You
Frederick Wiseman receives an Honorary Oscar Award at the 2016 Governors Awards

1930 births
Academy Honorary Award recipients
American documentary filmmakers
20th-century American Jews
George Polk Award recipients
Living people
MacArthur Fellows
Peabody Award winners
People from Boston
Williams College alumni
Yale Law School alumni
21st-century American Jews